Derek is a British comedy-drama television series starring, written by and directed by Ricky Gervais. The pilot was produced by Derek Productions Ltd. for Channel 4 and aired on 12 April 2012. Channel 4 describes the show as "A bittersweet comedy drama about a group of outsiders living on society's margins".

On 9 May 2012, Channel 4 announced it had commissioned a full series, which aired from 30 January 2013. On 4 March 2013 (two days before the final episode of the first series was aired), they announced Derek had been recommissioned for a second series, to be shown again on Channel 4 and later on Netflix.

The first series became available for streaming on Netflix on 12 September 2013. The second series, consisting of six episodes, started airing on 23 April 2014 on Channel 4 and concluded on 28 May 2014. In November 2014, Channel 4 announced that a 60-minute "final" special episode of Derek would air in the United Kingdom on 22 December 2014.

Genesis and pilot
The pilot episode aired on 12 April 2012 on Channel 4. Filmed in a mockumentary style, the programming is set mostly in a nursing home, and centres on Derek, a helper at the home. The title character made his first appearance in the 2001 Edinburgh Fringe show Rubbernecker.

Gervais says the programming was inspired by his relatives who work in care homes: "Half my family are care workers. My sister works with kids with learning difficulties. My sister-in-law works in a care home for people with Alzheimer's. And four or five of my nieces work in old people's homes. I always write about what I know."

Plot
Gervais plays 50-year-old Derek Noakes, a care worker at Broad Hill, a home for the elderly; he has worked there for three years. He likes watching reality television shows and game shows, and is interested in celebrities, YouTube and, above all, talking about animals. The viewer is told he is kind, helpful and selfless, with good intentions. He is vulnerable because of his childlike naivety and distractions from society. He is ridiculed and ostracised, as well as marginalised by mainstream society because of his social awkwardness and lack of inhibition. Derek says it is more important to be kind than to be clever or good-looking. Some commentators have described him as disabled or autistic, although Gervais denies this.

Cast

Main characters
 Ricky Gervais as Derek Noakes, an employee of the care home
 Kerry Godliman as Hannah, the care home's manager
 David Earl as Kevin "Kev" Twine, a homeless, unemployed alcoholic who hangs around the care home
 Karl Pilkington as Dougie, the home's caretaker (Main Series 1, guest Series 2)
 Colin Hoult as Geoff, the home's caretaker replacing Dougie after he leaves (Series 2 and Special)
 Holli Dempsey as Vicky, initially working in the care home on community service, she goes on to become a volunteer, an employee and eventually cover Hannah's maternity leave as acting manager
 Brett Goldstein as Tom, Hannah's love interest and grandson of Annie, a resident of the carehome

Regular characters
 Ninette Finch as Annie, Tom's grandmother
 Ruth Bratt as Mary
 Margaret Towner as Edna
 Joan Linder as Joan
 Kay Noone as Lizzie
 Vilma Hollingbery as Elsie
 Tim Barlow as Jack
 Arthur Nightingale as Arthur
 Tony Rohr as Anthony, Derek's father
 Sheila Collings as Sheila
 Barry Martin as Joe
 Prem Modgil as Prem
 Blanche Williams as Precious
 Laura Jane Hudson as Jill
 Pamela Lyne as Marge

Guest characters
 Doc Brown as Deon, works at the care home on community service - 1 episode
 Joe Wilkinson as Cliff Twine, Kev's brother - 2 episodes
 Vicky Hall as Tracy, Derek's girlfriend - 2 episodes
 Toby Foster as Les, Tom's work friend and best man at his wedding - 1 episode
 Tony Way as Pete, Jack's grandson - 1 episode
 Robert Vahey as Gerald, Lizzie's husband - 1 episode
 Susannah Wise as Rebecca, Hannah's former classmate and Jill's daughter - 1 episode
 Ashley McGuire as Shelley, Marge's daughter - 1 episode
 Tom Basden as Autograph expert - 1 episode
 Tom Hughes as Andy, a love interest for Vicky - 1 episode

Episodes

Pilot (2012)

Series 1 (2013)

Series 2 (2014)

Special (2014)

Reception 
On Rotten Tomatoes the first series holds a rating of 53% based on 32 critics, with the consensus reading: "Derek is as irreverent as might be expected from a show starring Ricky Gervais, but this time he brings a surprising amount of depth and empathy to the title character." On Metacritic, the first series of the show earned a rating of 64 out of 100, indicating "generally favorable reviews".

The show generated occasional controversy due to a perception by some viewers it mocks intellectual disability. Tanya Gold, writing for The Guardian, dismissed Gervais's claims in Derek, he was satirising prejudice against disabled people, instead saying it "feels more like lazy cruelty than satire". Jack Seale criticised the show for relying on elements and characterisations from other programming by Gervais. The Guardians Sam Wollaston found it to be "not very good", and says "the whole mockumentary thing feels tired now".

Tom Sutcliffe of The Independent questioned the wisdom of commissioning the programming: "To my mind, the pilot of Ricky Gervais's comedy about an assistant in a retirement home already fully explored its awkward – and testing – balance of comedy and emotion." About the titular character, he wrote "Derek's redeeming qualities are the hardest to take – a sense of self-congratulation at the refinement of its sentiments that has a little bit of the bully in it, too."

Gervais' performance as Derek received mixed reviews. Diane Werts of Newsday reacted positively, saying "Gervais nailed it". Curt Wagner of Red Eye says Gervais "surprises with some tender, quiet acting, and obvious love of the character. Rob Owen of Pittsburgh Post-Gazette says "although there could be an ick factor to Mr. Gervais playing a character with developmental issues, that turns out not to be the case. Mr. Gervais creates a character, not a caricature." On the other hand, The Guardians Sam Wollaston says "Ricky Gervais is out of his depth playing a character that isn't based on his worst foibles." Terry Ramsey of The Telegraph says "There is Gervais's cringe-making performance in the title role. I'm sorry, but Derek is simply Ricky Gervais in a patterned jumper with a cricked neck. Gervais is not a character actor, and what Derek needs to bring him alive is to be more believable. What he really needs is someone else playing him."

The second series of Derek generated some positive reviews. The second series currently holds a 67% based on 9 critics on Rotten Tomatoes. Hank Stuever of The Washington Post reacted positively, saying "Derek is an honest and often charming endeavor." Kyle Anderson of Entertainment Weekly also praised the show, but says the absence of Karl Pilkington hurt the series, saying: "The second series mostly upholds the first's tricky precedent, but the absence of regular Gervais associate Karl Pilkington means the yuks are a bit less hearty." Terry Ramsey of The Telegraph wrote, "We didn't need a second series of Ricky Gervais's comedy drama Derek." In a review in The Guardian, Sam Wollaston says "That's the other big problem with Derek...it's not very smart. Or very funny. Or very good." Msn.com says "Ricky Gervais' Derek remains a mawkish mess. Where to begin? The mockumentary format is moribund. The ethics are muddy. The tone is all over the place in everything but its consistent condescension." Matt D of Unrealitytv.co.uk agrees, saying "The primary reasons for this are the imbalance in tone and Gervais' central performance both of which stop Derek from a truly enjoyable program." AV Club says "Derek has all the creative ambition of [an online video of little piggies and bunnies doing cute things]." Indie Wire says "Series two is all over the map." Michael Hogan of The Telegraph says Derek is a "saccharine series" and "dreadful". Serena Davies, from the same publication, says "the show seems to have been devised by someone of Derek's limited intelligence... [I will not be] wasting any more of my time watching this rather flimsy, curiously pointless program." 

The special was given two stars out of five by The Telegraph. The reviewer, Ed Power, criticised the episode for the "weak performance" from Gervais and the "sub-Forrest Gump sympathy milking". He described it as "glib" and "manipulative". The Guardian reviewer Julia Raeside concurred, adding "I can find no comedy in it, and it lacks the emotional truth required for a drama."

Awards and nominations

DVD releases 
The complete first series of Derek was released on DVD and Blu-ray on 11 November 2013. The complete second series of Derek was released on DVD on 17 November 2014. A two-disc set containing the first and second series on DVD was also released on 17 November 2014.
Derek: The Special was released on DVD on 26 October 2015. A complete collection set was released featuring series and the special.

References

External links 
Derek on Channel 4

2012 British television series debuts
2014 British television series endings
2010s British comedy-drama television series
2010s British workplace comedy television series
2010s British workplace drama television series
British mockumentary television series
Channel 4 comedy dramas
English-language television shows
Television shows set in London
Television series created by Ricky Gervais